Gaetano Giani Luporini (28 May 1936 – 27 February 2022) was an Italian composer and academic.

Life and career 
Born in Lucca, the grandson of the composer Gaetano Luporini, after studying violin he enrolled at the Conservatorio Luigi Cherubini in Florence, graduating in composition under Roberto Lupi. Between 1968 and 1986 he was professor of Harmony and Counterpoint at his alma mater, and between 1986 and 2003 he directed the Luigi Boccherini Conservatory in his hometown.

Luporini composed chamber, opera, symphonic and choral music. He was also active as a composer of incidental music, and was well known as a faithful collaborator of Carmelo Bene for about twenty years.

Luporini died from complications of COVID-19 in Barga, Province of Lucca, on 27 February 2022, at the age of 85.

References

Further reading

External links 
 
 

1936 births
2022 deaths
20th-century classical composers
20th-century Italian composers
20th-century Italian male musicians
Italian classical composers
Musicians from Lucca
Italian opera composers
Male opera composers
Italian male classical composers
Deaths from the COVID-19 pandemic in Tuscany